Douglas Hudson (May 25, 1905 – May 2, 1983) was an American politician from New York.

Biography
He was born on May 25, 1905, in Castleton, New York, and resided in Rensselaer County, New York for his entire life. He graduated from Albany Business College and entered politics as a Republican.

He was a Deputy Sheriff in 1942 when he was appointed as Rensselaer County Welfare Commissioner. In 1951 he became Chairman of the Rensselaer County Republican Party. In 1952, Hudson was appointed as Sheriff of Rensselaer County, and later was elected to the post twice.

In November 1959, Hudson was elected to the New York State Assembly to fill the vacancy caused by the resignation of Thomas H. Brown. He was re-elected twice and remained in the Assembly until 1964, sitting in the 172nd, 173rd and 174th New York State Legislatures. In November 1964, he ran for re-election, but was defeated by Democrat James A. Lombard. In November 1965, he was elected again to the Assembly, and sat in the 176th New York State Legislature.

Hudson was a member of the New York State Senate from 1967 to 1976, sitting in the 177th, 178th, 179th, 180th and 181st New York State Legislatures. In 1975, Hudson pleaded guilty to reckless driving and paid a fine after having been charged with driving while intoxicated and leaving the scene of an accident.

Hudson died on May 2, 1983, in Memorial Hospital in Albany, New York; and was buried at the Horizon View Cemetery in Brookview.

Hudson Hall at Hudson Valley Community College is named for him.

Sources

1905 births
1983 deaths
Republican Party members of the New York State Assembly
Republican Party New York (state) state senators
People from Rensselaer County, New York
20th-century American politicians
Albany Business College alumni